Salim–Javed were an Indian screenwriting duo, composed of Salim Khan and Javed Akhtar, working in Bollywood. They are noted for being among the first Indian screenwriters to achieve star status, becoming one of the most successful Indian screenwriters of all time. They are regarded as among "Hindi cinema's greatest screenwriters". They worked together on 24 films during 1971–1987, of which twenty were commercially and critically successful films. They worked together on 22 Bollywood films, as well as two Kannada films.

Salim–Javed revolutionized Indian cinema in the 1970s, transforming and reinventing the Bollywood formula, and pioneering the Bollywood blockbuster format. A significant departure from the romance films that had previously dominated Bollywood, Salim–Javed pioneered cultural phenomena such as the "angry young man" character archetype, the masala film, the Dacoit Western genre, and Bombay underworld crime films. Salim–Javed's films also had a wider impact on Indian society, with themes relevant to the socio-economic and socio-political climate of 1970s India, especially during The Emergency period, such as urban slum poverty, political corruption, and organized crime, while presenting progressive, feminist and anti-establishment themes, which resonated with Indian audiences in the 1970s and early 1980s. During their time working together, the duo won six Filmfare Awards, out of ten nominations. Their films are also among the highest-grossing Indian films of all time, including Sholay (1975), the highest-grossing Indian film ever at the time, as well as films such as Seeta Aur Geeta (1972), Zanjeer (1973), Deewaar (1975), Kranti (1981), and the Don franchise. Sholay is also considered to be one of the greatest Indian films of all time.

While working together, Salim Khan was largely responsible for developing the stories and characters, which were considered unconventional at the time, while Javed Akhtar was largely responsible for writing the dialogues. Many of the dialogues they wrote for their films have become famous. Although the dialogues are often referred to as Hindi, they are actually mostly in Urdu, a register of the Hindustani language. Coming from backgrounds in Urdu literature, they mostly included vocabulary from Urdu, and wrote their dialogues in Urdu script, with the Urdu dialogues then transcribed by an assistant into Devanagari script so that Hindi readers could also read the Urdu dialogues.

The duo made the writer's role popular with their names appearing in the posters of the films, and in some films they shared up to 25% of the profit. Their association lasted until 1982, when both decided to split after which Javed Akhtar moved into writing lyrics for around 80 films and scripts for 20 films from 1981 till present times, while Salim Khan wrote for 10 scripts between 1983 and 1996. They are credited together on two films after the split, Zamana (1985) and Mr. India (1987), due to these scripts being written earlier and made into film later after their split. In addition, their films had many South Indian remakes, which were often licensed directly from Salim–Javed, who owned the South Indian remake rights to their films.

Before teaming up

Salim Khan 

Salim Khan was born on 24 November 1935 at Indore. He debuted as an actor after director K. Amarnath saw him at a wedding and was impressed by his good looks. He asked him to come to Mumbai, where he hired him as an actor for Rs. 500 a month. Salim Khan was earlier a junior technician for various films had not made any considerable mark in the field. Khan acted in various movies, in large and small parts, for seven years. He was unable to capture the public's interest, and, as a result, his career had stalled. Khan appeared in such films as Teesri Manzil (1966), Sarhaadi Lootera (1966) and Diwaana (1967), in total he has acted in 14 films till 1970. But he did not achieve success as an actor.

After working in 25 films, despite his handsome looks, he eventually understood that he "was not cut out to be an actor because I lacked the art of projection. But by then it was too late — how could I have gone back to Indore?" In the late 1960s, Salim Khan, who was struggling financially, decided to start shifting his focus away from acting and towards writing scripts, and continued to use the name Prince Salim. One of his more notable film scripts was Do Bhai (1969). He also began working with Abrar Alvi as a writing assistant.

Javed Akhtar 

Javed Akhtar was born on 17 January 1945. Early influences on Akhtar included Urdu novels by Pakistani author Ibn-e-Safi, such as the Jasoosi Dunya and Imran series of detective novels, as well as films like the Dilip Kumar starrers Arzoo (1950) and Aan (1952), Bimal Roy's Do Bigha Zameen (1953), Shree 420 (1955) directed by Raj Kapoor and written by Khwaja Ahmad Abbas, and Mehboob Khan's Mother India (1957).

Akhtar arrived in Mumbai on 4 October 1964. In his early years there, he wrote the dialogue for a minor film for Rs. 100. Occasionally, he worked as an assistant. He got a job as a dialogue-writer on Yakeen which flopped. He was unsuccessful in his individual ventures till 1971.

History

After teaming up 
Salim met up with Javed Akhtar for first time during the making of the film Sarhadi Lootera. Salim was a small-time actor, and Sarhadi Lootera was one of the last films he acted in before he turned his attention to writing. Javed was a clapper boy for the film and was later made the dialogue writer as director S.M. Sagar was unable to find a dialogue writer. While working in this film their friendship began.

Salim Khan used to assist writer/director Abrar Alvi at first and Javed Akhtar used to assist Kaifi Azmi. Abrar Alvi and Kaifi Azmi were neighbours, from there on Salim Khan and Javed Akhtar became friends. Since their individual work was flopping both of them ventured into script writing and they decided to team up in 1971. Realizing the lack of writers in the movie making industry, Salim gradually learnt about story telling and writing techniques used in films, along with close friend Javed Akhtar and began writing short transcripts. The duo hit it off well and formed a script-writing team that came to be known as Salim–Javed. Salim used to form stories and plots whereas Javed used to help Salim with the dialogues for those films. They used to brainstorm and come to conclusions regarding the final draft of the film. Akhtar first joined Khan to develop the story for Adhikar and Andaz (both 1971).

Initially in the 1970s there was no concept of having the same writer for the screenplay, story and dialogue nor were the writers given any credits in the title. Rajesh Khanna is credited with giving Salim Khan and Javed Akhtar their first chance to become screenplay writers by offering them work in Haathi Mere Saathi (1971). Javed Akhtar accepted in an interview that "One day, he went to Salimsaab and said that Mr. Devar had given him a huge signing amount with which he could complete the payment for his bungalow Aashirwad. But the film was a remake [of Deiva Cheyal] and the script of the original was far from being satisfactory. He told us that if we could set right the script, he would make sure we got both money and credit." Salim–Javed were hired by G. P. Sippy's Sippy Films as resident screenwriters and produced the screenplays for successful films like Andaz, Seeta Aur Geeta, Sholay and Don. They have worked together in 24 films including two hit Kannada films (both starring Dr.Rajkumar) – Premada Kanike and Raja Nanna Raja. Though they split in 1982, due to ego issues, some of the scripts they wrote were made into hit films later like Zamana and Mr. India.

Salim–Javed (as they are famously called) have scripted many commercially and critically accepted movies for movie making giants like Nasir Hussain (Yaadon Ki Baaraat), Prakash Mehra (Zanjeer and Haath Ki Safai), Ravi Tandon (Majboor), Yash Chopra (Deewaar, Trishul and Kaala Patthar), Yash Johar (Dostana), Ramesh Sippy (Seeta Aur Geeta and Sholay), Ramesh Talwar (Zamana), Shekhar Kapoor (Mr. India) and with Chand Barot (Don). The duo split up in the early 1982 and ended their 12-year professional relationship because they developed ego issues. Of the 24 films they wrote the scripts for, the film which were not successful at box office include Aakhri Dao (1975), Immaan Dharam (1977), Kaala Patthar (1979) and Shaan (1981).

After their split 
Salim Khan after the split was not very active in films. Though he did write the scripts for about 10 films after his split with Javed Akhthar like Naam (1986), Kabzaa, Toofan (1989), Jurm (1990), Akayla, Patthar Ke Phool, Mast Kalandar (all in 1991), Aa Gale Lag Jaa (1994), Majhdhaar and  Dil Tera Diwana (both 1996). Of these scripts, Toofan, Akayla, Majhdaar, Aa Gale Lag Jaa and Dil Tera Deewana failed at the box office. Salim Khan's eldest son, Salman Khan, made his film debut at the age of twenty two with Biwi Ho To Aisi in the year 1988 and eventually went on to become one of the most successful actors in the history of Bollywood. Salman Khan has collaborated with his father Salim Khan in Patthar Ke Phool and Majhdhaar, and with Javed Akhtar in only one film – Marigold (2007), in his three-decade long career. Javed Akhtar, on the other hand, has worked in all the films produced by his children Farhan Akhtar and Zoya Akhtar's Excel Entertainment. Javed Akhtar started writing lyrics for films beginning with Silsila in 1981 and since 1982 has written lyrics for around 80 films and scripts for over 20 films till the present times. Javed and Salim were not even on talking terms after their split till 2012, when their original script Zanjeer was being remade into a 2013 film of the same name by producer Sumeet Mehra. Salim and Javed had filed a suit in the Bombay High Court in July 2013 claiming they had copyrights over the script, story and dialogues of the original film, produced by Prakash Mehra and demanded compensation from the makers of the remake. This court case brought them together again on talking terms.

Their last unofficial partnership was for the film Baghban (2003). Amitabh Bachchan requested to Javed Akhtar to write his final speech. Salman Khan, for his speech prior to that, requested his father Salim Khan to write his speech. However, neither Salim Khan nor Javed Akhtar were credited.

Contributions

Screenwriter profession 
They have worked together in 24 films including two Kannada films – Premada Kanike and Raja Nanna Raja. Though they split in 1982 some of the scripts they wrote were made into films later like Zamana and Mr. India. They are credited with the creation of the "angry young man" image of Amitabh Bachchan. For a significant number of his major hits, they wrote the screenplay, story and dialogue. They brought credibility to a profession which had previously been relegated to the background. It is due to their efforts and work that screenplay/story/dialogue writers are seeing the limelight. They fought for and achieved the mentioning of screenplay/story/dialogue writer's names on the movie posters.

According to Javed Akhtar, in their early periods, on the cinema posters, there were no names of script writer, story and screenplay.  Realizing that the hard work is done by this duo, and not getting the appropriate recognition, Salim and Javed decided to paint their names on all the posters pasted in the city.  They hired a rikshaw and put the paint bucket on that and did all the work themselves the entire night.  After that, the directors also started to put their name on the posters.

Bollywood cinema 
Salim–Javed revolutionized Indian cinema, particularly Bollywood. At the time, Hindi cinema was experiencing thematic stagnation, dominated by family-friendly romance films with "romantic hero" leads. The arrival of the non-conformist screenwriter pair Salim–Javed marked a paradigm shift for the industry, with their creative innovations that proved to be a significant breakthrough for Hindi cinema, and resurrected Indian cinema.

Salim–Javed began the genre of gritty, violent, Bombay underworld crime films, in the 1970s, with films such as Zanjeer (1973) and Deewaar (1975). Deewaar, which pitted "a policeman against his brother, a gang leader based on real-life smuggler Haji Mastan" portrayed by Bachchan, was described as being "absolutely key to Indian cinema" by Danny Boyle.

They also pioneered the masala film format. Yaadon Ki Baarat (1973), directed by Nasir Hussain and written by Salim–Javed, has been identified as the first masala film and the "first" quintessentially "Bollywood" film. Salim–Javed subsequently went on to write more successful masala films in the 1970s and 1980s.

Both of these trends, the violent crime film and the masala film, came together with the blockbuster Sholay (1975). It combined the dacoit film conventions of Mother India (1957) and Gunga Jumna (1961) with that of Spaghetti Westerns, spawning the Dacoit Western genre (also known as the "Curry Western"), which was popular in the 1970s. Sholay is considered to be one of the greatest Indian films of all time. It has been described as the "Star Wars of Bollywood", with its impact on Bollywood comparable to the impact Star Wars (1977) later had on Hollywood, while the villain Gabbar Singh (Amjad Khan) has been compared to Darth Vader. Salim–Javed also created the Don franchise, one of the biggest Indian film franchises.

Salim–Javed were also responsible for launching the career of Bollywood superstar Amitabh Bachchan. Salim Khan conceived the "angry young man" persona that he became famous for, and introduced him to directors Prakash Mehra and Manmohan Desai. Salim–Javed often wrote their scripts with Bachchan in mind for the lead role, and insisted he be cast for their films early in his career, including Zanjeer, Deewaar, and Sholay, roles which established Bachchan as a superstar.

South Indian cinema 
Their work was also highly influential in South Indian cinema. In addition to writing two Kannada films – the highly successful Rajkumar and Arathi starrers of 1976 – Raja Nanna Raja and Premada Kanike, many of their Bollywood films had remakes produced in other South Indian film industries, including Tamil cinema, Telugu cinema and Malayalam cinema. While the Bollywood directors and producers held the rights to their films in Northern India, it was Salim–Javed who held the rights to their films in South India, where they sold the remake rights to various South Indian filmmakers, usually for around  each, for films such as Zanjeer, Yaadon Ki Baarat, and Don.

Much like their role in launching the career of Amitabh Bachchan, Salim–Javed also played an important role in launching the career of South Indian superstar Rajinikanth. Several Tamil remakes of their films became breakthroughs for Rajinikanth, who was cast in Amitabh Bachchan's role. The Tamil remake of Don (1978) in particular, Billa (1980), was a turning point in Rajinikanth's career, as his first blockbuster hit. He also starred in several other hit Salim–Javed adaptations in Bachchan's role, including Thee (1981), Mr. Bharath (1986), and Naan Vazhavaippen (1979). Of the four prominent south industries, their movies were remade the least in Kannada.

Screenwriter V. Vijayendra Prasad, responsible for a number of blockbusters in the early 21st century, including the South Indian franchise Baahubali and the 2015 Hindi film Bajrangi Bhaijaan (starring Salim's son Salman Khan), cited Salim–Javed as a major inspiration on his work, especially their screenplay for Sholay, among other films.

Indian society 
Salim–Javed's films had a wider impact on Indian society. Their films reflected the socio-economic and socio-political realities of 1970s India, channeling the growing popular discontent and disillusionment among the masses, and the failure of the state in ensuring their welfare and well-being, in a time when prices were rapidly rising, commodities were becoming scarce, public institutions were losing legitimacy, and smugglers and gangsters were gathering political clout. There was also an unprecedented growth of slums across India in the 1970s, particularly in Bombay, the most famous being Dharavi, which was represented in Deewaar (1975).

Their films often dealt with themes relevant to Indian society at the time, such as urban poverty in slums, corruption in society, and the Bombay underworld crime scene. While inspired by Mehboob Khan's Mother India (1957) and Dilip Kumar's Gunga Jumna (1961), Salim–Javed reinterpreted their rural themes in a contemporary urban context reflecting the changing socio-political climate of 1970s India, which resonated with Indian audiences in the 1970s.

Some of their films in the 1970s, especially Deewaar, were perceived by audiences to be anti-establishment. This was represented by the "angry young man", conceived by Salim–Javed and portrayed by Amitabh Bachchan, often presented as a vigilante or anti-hero, establishing Bachchan's image as the "angry young man" of Indian cinema. The "angry young man" was seen as a new kind of hero, with his suppressed rage giving a voice to the angst of the urban poor.

Their portrayal of female heroines was also progressive and feminist for Indian society the time. For example, Seeta Aur Geeta (1972) subverted the formula of Dilip Kumar starrer Ram Aur Shyam (1972), replacing twin brothers with twin sisters, and having the heroine Hema Malini eventually become the "hero" while male lead Dharmendra is in a mostly supporting role. Parveen Babi's character in Deewaar is portrayed as "a modern woman who felt no guilt or shame in having pre-marital sex, drinking or smoking," which was "novel and revolutionary" at the time, and she became seen as the "new Bollywood woman". Similar feminist undertones appear in Sholay (1975), where Basanti (Hema Malini) is a "straight-talking, earthy and independent young woman doing a man’s job".

International cinema 
Beyond their influence on Indian films, their work has also influenced international films. Their 1975 film Deewaar had an influence on Hong Kong cinema and in turn Hollywood cinema, by playing a key role in the creation of the heroic bloodshed crime genre of 1980s Hong Kong action cinema. Deewaar, along with several later 1970s "angry young man" epics it inspired, such as Amar Akbar Anthony (1977), had similarities to elements later seen in 1980s Hong Kong heroic bloodshed films. Hong Kong's Shaw Brothers studio remade Deewaar as The Brothers (1979), which in turn inspired John Woo's internationally acclaimed breakthrough A Better Tomorrow (1986). A Better Tomorrow set the template for heroic bloodshed films, a genre that went on to have a significant influence on Hong Kong films in the 1980s and later Hollywood movies in the 1990s, inspiring filmmakers such as Quentin Tarantino along with John Woo's entry into Hollywood.

According to Loveleen Tandan, the screenwriter Simon Beaufoy, who wrote the screenplay for the Academy Award winning Slumdog Millionaire (2008), "studied Salim-Javed's kind of cinema minutely." In particular, Deewaar was praised by Danny Boyle and influenced the making of Slumdog Millionaire. Actor Anil Kapoor (who stars in the film) noted that some scenes of Slumdog Millionaire "are like Deewaar, the story of two brothers of whom one is completely after money while the younger one is honest and not interested in money." One of the techniques often used by Salim–Javed was their use of a montage sequence to represent a child growing into an adult, a technique that dates back to Awaara (1951), directed by Raj Kapoor and written by Khwaja Ahmad Abbas. For example, Deewaar showed a character entering a temple as a child and then leaving the temple as an adult. Slumdog Millionaire paid homage to Salim–Javed by showing a montage sequence where two "brothers jump off a train and suddenly they are seven years older". In Slumdog Millionaire, two characters have names referencing the duo: Salim K. Malik (brother of protagonist Jamal Malik) and Javed Khan (played by Mahesh Manjrekar).

Filmography

Hindi films

Kannada films

Awards and nominations

Filmfare Awards 

Films with Salim–Javed writing credits that were nominated for or won the Filmfare Award for Best Film:

Zanjeer (1973)  Nominated
Deewaar (1975)  Won
Sholay (1975)  Nominated
Trishul (1978)  Nominated
Kaala Patthar (1979)  Nominated
Shakti (1982)  Won
Baghban (2003)  Nominated
Don: The Chase Begins Again (2006)  Nominated

Sholay received a special award at the 50th Filmfare Awards in 2005: Best Film of 50 Years.

British Film Institute 
Sholay (1975) was ranked first in the British Film Institute's 2002 poll of "Top 10 Indian Films" of all time.

Box office performance 
The following table lists the box office performance of Bollywood films written by Salim–Javed. The table covers the domestic box office in India, in addition to the overseas box office. The vast majority of the overseas box office for their films up until the 1980s came from the Soviet Union, which was the largest overseas market for Indian films up until then.

The gross revenue figures in the table do not take inflation into account. The gross revenue numbers given below are nominal figures, not inflation-adjusted figures. In terms of footfalls (ticket sales), the 22 films listed below are estimated to have sold a total of over  tickets worldwide, averaging more than  ticket sales per film.

See also  
 Javed Akhtar

Notes

References

External links 
 
 

 
20th-century Indian Muslims
Filmfare Awards winners
Indian male screenwriters
Indian screenwriting duos
Screenwriters from Mumbai
Urdu-language writers